Spencer is a city in McCook County, South Dakota, United States. The population was 136 at the 2020 census. The city was almost destroyed by a violent F4 tornado on May 30, 1998 which killed six people.

History
Spencer was laid out in 1887 when the railroad was extended to that point. The city was named for H. Spencer, a railroad official. A post office has been in operation in Spencer since 1887. Spencer was officially incorporated in 1917.

1998 tornado
On May 30, 1998, the most destructive and second deadliest tornado in South Dakota history struck Spencer. It began as a large, dust-cloaked tornado northwest of Farmer in Hanson County, concurrent with the demise of the "Fulton" tornado. Continuing toward the east-southeast, it struck several farmsteads before crossing the Hanson/McCook County line a half mile west-northwest of Spencer. At this time, the tornado was being observed by the OU Doppler on Wheels crew, whose mobile Doppler radar data showed up to 264 mph winds in the tornado a few tens of meters above ground level. The population of the town diminished soon after to less than half of what it was previous to the tornado, from 315 to 145 in April 1999, and has since hovered around that mark.

Geography
Spencer is located at  (43.727853, -97.592033).

Spencer has been assigned the ZIP code 57374 and the FIPS place code 60060.

Demographics

2010 census
As of the census of 2010, there were 154 people, 60 households, and 47 families residing in the city. The racial makeup of the city was 96.8% White, 0.6% African American, and 2.6% from two or more races. Hispanic or Latino of any race were 2.6% of the population.

There were 60 households, of which 30.0% had children under the age of 18 living with them, 66.7% were married couples living together, 11.7% had a female householder with no husband present, and 21.7% were non-families. 20.0% of all households were made up of individuals, and 8.3% had someone living alone who was 65 years of age or older. The average household size was 2.57 and the average family size was 2.94.

The median age in the city was 42.7 years. 29.9% of residents were under the age of 18; 1.9% were between the ages of 18 and 24; 19.4% were from 25 to 44; 24.6% were from 45 to 64; and 24% were 65 years of age or older. The gender makeup of the city was 48.1% male and 51.9% female.

2000 census
As of the census of 2000, there were 157 people, 64 households, and 44 families residing in the city. The population density was 596.7 people per square mile (233.1/km2). There were 73 housing units at an average density of 277.4 per square mile (108.4/km2). The racial makeup of the city was 98.73% White, 0.64% Native American and 0.64% Asian.

There were 64 households, out of which 31.3% had children under the age of 18 living with them, 59.4% were married couples living together, 6.3% had a female householder with no husband present, and 31.3% were non-families. 31.3% of all households were made up of individuals, and 20.3% had someone living alone who was 65 years of age or older. The average household size was 2.45 and the average family size was 3.05.

In the city, the population was spread out, with 28.7% under the age of 18, 6.4% from 18 to 24, 25.5% from 25 to 44, 21.7% from 45 to 64, and 17.8% who were 65 years of age or older. The median age was 37 years. For every 100 females, there were 86.9 males. For every 100 females age 18 and over, there were 80.6 males.

The median income for a household in the city was $21,250, and the median income for a family was $34,688. Males had a median income of $26,250 versus $22,500 for females. The per capita income for the city was $13,164. About 7.0% of families and 11.4% of the population were below the poverty line, including 14.6% of those under the age of eighteen and 14.8% of those 65 or over.

See also
 Late-May 1998 tornado outbreak and derecho

Notes

Cities in McCook County, South Dakota
Cities in South Dakota
Tornadoes of 1998
Sioux Falls, South Dakota metropolitan area